Prairie View is an unincorporated community in Logan County, Arkansas, United States.

References

Unincorporated communities in Logan County, Arkansas
Unincorporated communities in Arkansas